Hordern Pavilion (known locally as The Hordern) is a building located in Moore Park, Sydney, New South Wales, Australia, on the grounds of the old Sydney Showground. The building has been an architecturally and socially significant Sydney landmark since its construction in 1924. Now best known as a dance party and rock concert venue, the Hordern Pavilion was originally constructed for the Royal Agricultural Society of New South Wales to meet the increasing demands for exhibition space at the Royal Easter Show.

History
The Pavilion was named in honour of the enterprising retail Hordern family, Anthony Hordern and Sons, and Sir Samuel Hordern, who was the president of the Royal Agricultural Society from 1915 to 1941. The building is designed in the Inter-War Academic Classical Style with rendered masonry featuring classical detailing inside and out, including fluted Doric columns, a parapet and an imposing vaulted roof with lantern tower. Designed by Northern Sydney architecture firm Trenchard Smith & Maisey, it cost £45,000 to originally build. The pavilion was officially opened on 2 April 1924 by the Premier, Sir George Fuller. The pavilion has also been the site of championship boxing over the years with, among others, former World Champion Jeff Fenech fighting at the venue.

Performances

Babymetal - 9 June 2023

References

External links
Official Hordern Pavilion Website

Boxing venues in Australia
Buildings and structures completed in 1924
Music venues in Sydney
Sports venues in Sydney
Darts venues
Moore Park, New South Wales
Horden family